The 1947 Fresno State Bulldogs football team represented Fresno State Normal School—now known as California State University, Fresno—during the 1947 college football season. Fresno State competed in the California Collegiate Athletic Association (CCAA). The team was led by first-year head coach Ken Gleason and played home games at Ratcliffe Stadium on the campus of Fresno City College in Fresno, California. They finished the season with a record of three wins, six losses and two ties (3–6–2, 2–1–2 CCAA). The Bulldogs were outscored 133–236 for the season.

Schedule

Team players in the NFL
No Fresno State Bulldog players were selected in the 1948 NFL Draft.

The following Fresno State Bulldog players finished their college career in 1947, were not drafted, but played in the NFL.

References

Fresno State
Fresno State Bulldogs football seasons
Fresno State Bulldogs football